Zenkovci is a settlement in the Municipality of Puconci in the Prekmurje region of Slovenia.

References

External links
Zenkovci on Geopedia

Populated places in the Municipality of Puconci